A shareholders' agreement (sometimes referred to in the U.S. as a stockholders' agreement) (SHA) is an agreement amongst the shareholders or members of a company. In practical effect, it is analogous to a partnership agreement. It can be said that some jurisdictions fail to give a proper definition to the concept of shareholders' agreement, however particular consequences of this agreements are defined so far. There are advantages of the shareholder's agreement; to be specific, it helps the corporate entity to maintain the absence of publicity and keep the confidentiality. Nonetheless, there are also some disadvantages that should be considered, such as the limited effect to the third parties (especially assignees and share purchasers) and alternation of the stipulated articles can be time consuming.

Purpose
In strict legal theory, the relationships amongst the shareholders and those between the shareholders and the company are regulated by the constitutional documents of the company. However, where there are a relatively small number of shareholders, like in a startup company, it is quite common in practice for the shareholders to supplement the constitutional document.
There are a number of reasons why the shareholders may wish to supplement (or supersede) the constitutional documents of the company in this way:

 a company's constitutional documents are normally available for public inspection, whereas the terms of a shareholders' agreement, as a private law contract, are normally confidential between the parties.
 contractual arrangements are generally cheaper and less formal to form, administer, revise or terminate.
 the shareholders might wish to provide for disputes to be resolved by arbitration, or in the courts of a foreign country (meaning a country other than the country in which the company is incorporated). In some countries, corporate law does not permit such dispute resolution clauses to be included in the constitutional documents.
 greater flexibility; the shareholders may anticipate that the company's business requires regular changes to their arrangements, and it may be unwieldy to repeatedly amend the corporate constitution.
 corporate law in the relevant country may not provide sufficient protection for minority shareholders, who may seek to better protect their position by using a shareholders' agreement.
 to provide formulas for share valuation to cut down on shareholders disputes over the value they can demand for their shares either on voluntary or on compulsory transfers
 to restrict the activities of shareholders – preventing abuse of position and competing activities
 to provide mechanisms for removing minority shareholders which preserve the company as a going concern.

Risks
There are also certain risks which can be associated with putting a shareholders' agreement in place in some countries.

 In some countries, using a shareholders' agreement can constitute a partnership, which can have unintended tax consequences, or result in liability attaching to shareholders in the event of a bankruptcy.
 Where the shareholders' agreement is inconsistent with the constitutional documents, the efficacy of the parties' intended arrangement can be undermined.
 Countries with notarial formalities, where notarial fees are set by the value of the subject matter, parties can find that their agreement is subject to prohibitively high notarial costs, which, if they fail to pay, would result in the agreement being unenforceable.
 In certain circumstances, a shareholders' agreement can be put forward as evidence of a conspiracy and/or monopolistic practices.

Common characteristics
Shareholders' agreements vary enormously between different countries and different commercial fields. However, in a characteristic joint venture or business startup, a shareholders' agreement would normally be expected to regulate the following matters:

 regulating the ownership and voting rights of the shares in the company, including 
 Lock-down provisions
 restrictions on transferring shares, or granting security interests over shares
 pre-emption rights and rights of first refusal in relation to any shares issued by the company (often called a buy-sell agreement)
 "tag-along" and "drag-along" rights
 minority protection provisions
 control and management of the company, which may include
 power for certain shareholders to designate individual for election to the board of directors
 imposing super-majority voting requirements for "reserved matters" which are of key importance to the parties
 imposing requirements to provide shareholders with accounts or other information that they might not otherwise be entitled to by law
 making provision for the resolution of any future disputes between shareholders, including
 deadlock provisions
 dispute resolution provisions
 protecting the competitive interests of the company which may include
 restrictions on a shareholder's ability to be involved in a competing business to the company
 restrictions on a shareholder's ability to poach key employees of the company
 key terms with suppliers or customers who are also shareholders
 protecting selling rights of shareholders, including
Piggy-back clauses

In addition, shareholders agreements will often make provision for the following:

 the nature and amount of initial contribution (whether capital contribution or other) to the company
 the proposed nature of the business
 how any future capital contributions or financing arrangements are to be made
 the governing law of the shareholders' agreement
 ethical practices or environmental practices
 allocation of key roles or responsibilities

Registration
In most countries, registration of a shareholders' agreement is not required for it to be effective. Indeed, it is the perceived greater flexibility of contract law over corporate law that provides much of the raison d'être for shareholders' agreements.

This flexibility, however, can give rise to conflicts between a shareholders' agreement and the constitutional documents of a company. Although laws differ across countries, in general most conflicts are resolved as follows:

 as against outside parties, only the constitutional documents regulate the company's powers and proceedings.
 as between the company and its shareholders, a breach of the shareholders' agreement which does not breach the constitutional documents will still be a valid corporate act, but it may sound in damages against the party who breaches the agreement.
 as between the company and its shareholders, a breach of the constitutional documents which does not breach the shareholders' agreement will nonetheless usually be an invalid corporate act.
 characteristically, courts will not grant an injunction or award specific performance in relation to a shareholders' agreement where to do so would be inconsistent with the company's constitutional documents.

Notes

External links
 Shareholders' Agreement Guide - English and Welsh law
 Shareholder Agreements: the 30 minute guide

Business law
Corporate law
Contract law
Legal terminology
Legal documents
Agreement